Iliya Valov (born 29 December 1961 in Knezha) is a Bulgarian former football goalkeeper who played for Bulgaria.

Career
Valov made 180 appearances for Botev Vratsa from 1981 to 1988. He was the number two goalkeeper to Borislav Mihaylov in Bulgaria's squad at Mexico 86. He made a total of 31 caps with the national team.

During his career he saved 12 penalty kicks in the top division of Bulgarian football.

After retiring as a player, Valov worked as a goalkeeping coach for Cherno More Varna until 2004 before following coach Plamen Markov to CSKA Sofia.

He is the father of Valentin Iliev.

References

1961 births
Living people
People from Knezha
Bulgarian footballers
Bulgaria international footballers
FC Botev Vratsa players
PFC CSKA Sofia players
FC Lokomotiv 1929 Sofia players
Berliner FC Dynamo players
FK Austria Wien players
PFC Dobrudzha Dobrich players
Denizlispor footballers
1986 FIFA World Cup players
First Professional Football League (Bulgaria) players
Austrian Football Bundesliga players
Süper Lig players
Expatriate footballers in East Germany
Expatriate footballers in Austria
Expatriate footballers in Turkey
Bulgarian expatriate sportspeople in Turkey
Bulgarian expatriate footballers
DDR-Oberliga players
Association football goalkeepers